Helsinki is one of the 13 electoral districts of the Parliament of Finland, the national legislature of Finland. The district was established in 1954 from parts of Uusimaa.  It is conterminous with the municipality of Helsinki. The district currently elects 22 of the 200 members of the Parliament of Finland using the open party-list proportional representation electoral system. At the 2019 parliamentary election it had 540,883 registered electors.

Electoral system
Helsinki currently elects 22 of the 200 members of the Parliament of Finland using the open party-list proportional representation electoral system. Parties may form electoral alliances with each other to pool their votes and increase their chances of winning seats. However. the number of candidates nominated by an electoral alliance may not exceed the maximum number of candidates that a single party may nominate. Seats are allocated using the D'Hondt method.

Summary

(Figures in italics represent joint lists.)

Detailed

2010s

2019
Results of the 2019 parliamentary election held on 14 April 2019:

The following candidates were elected:
Outi Alanko-Kahiluoto (Vihr), 5,961 votes; Paavo Arhinmäki (Vas), 6,775 votes; Eva Biaudet (SFP), 5,446 votes; Tuula Haatainen (SDP), 11,100 votes; Pekka Haavisto (Vihr), 20,163 votes; Jussi Halla-aho (PS), 30,596 votes; Atte Harjanne (Vihr), 4,795 votes; Eveliina Heinäluoma (SDP), 9,465 votes; Mari Holopainen (Vihr), 7,094 votes; Veronika Honkasalo (Vas), 5,846 votes; Emma Kari (Vihr), 6,716 votes; Mai Kivelä (Vas), 6,790 votes; Terhi Koulumies (Kok), 7,233 votes; Maria Ohisalo (Vihr), 11,897 votes; Tom Packalén (PS), 2,028 votes; Jaana Pelkonen (KoK), 10,563 votes; Mari Rantanen (PS), 2,924 votes; Wille Rydman (KoK), 5,910 votes; Sari Sarkomaa (Kok), 6,806 votes; Erkki Tuomioja (SDP), 5,044 votes; Juhana Vartiainen (Kok), 8,206 votes; and Ben Zyskowicz (Kok), 12,556 votes.

2015
Results of the 2015 parliamentary election held on 19 April 2015:

The following candidates were elected:
Outi Alanko-Kahiluoto (Vihr), 7,884 votes; Paavo Arhinmäki (Vas), 7,910 votes; Eva Biaudet (SFP), 5,515 votes; Tuula Haatainen (SDP), 6,662 votes; Pekka Haavisto (Vihr), 14,204 votes; Eero Heinäluoma (SDP), 9,703 votes; Emma Kari (Vihr), 4,647 votes; Silvia Modig (Vas), 6,190 votes; Tom Packalén (PS), 5,089 votes; Jaana Pelkonen (KoK), 15,964 votes; Mika Raatikainen (PS), 3,370 votes; Nasima Razmyar (SDP), 5,156 votes; Olli Rehn (Kesk), 6,837 votes; Wille Rydman (KoK), 4,524 votes; Pertti Salolainen (KoK), 4,502 votes; Sari Sarkomaa (Kok), 7,052 votes; Sampo Terho (PS), 10,067 votes; Erkki Tuomioja (SDP), 11,154 votes; Antero Vartia (Vihr), 6,859 votes; Juhana Vartiainen (Kok), 11,436 votes; Ozan Yanar (Vihr), 4,196 votes; and Ben Zyskowicz (Kok), 15,395 votes.

2011
Results of the 2011 parliamentary election held on 17 April 2011:

The following candidates were elected:
Outi Alanko-Kahiluoto (Vihr), 5,240 votes; Paavo Arhinmäki (Vas), 17,226 votes; Pekka Haavisto (Vihr), 7,470 votes; Jussi Halla-aho (PS), 15,074 votes; Eero Heinäluoma (SDP), 9,501 votes; Rakel Hiltunen (SDP), 4,882 votes; Mari Kiviniemi (Kesk), 8,812 votes; Päivi Lipponen (SDP), 4,381 votes; Lasse Männistö (Kok), 4,866 votes; Silvia Modig (Vas), 4,681 votes; Tom Packalén (PS), 4,380 votes; Jaana Pelkonen (KoK), 5,897 votes; Pertti Salolainen (KoK), 6,205 votes; Sari Sarkomaa (Kok), 7,457 votes; Anni Sinnemäki (Vihr), 7,513 votes; Osmo Soininvaara (Vihr), 8,285 votes; Astrid Thors (SFP), 4,983 votes; Erkki Tuomioja (SDP), 9,970 votes; Juha Väätäinen (PS), 2,914 votes; Jan Vapaavuori (Kok), 11,203 votes; and Ben Zyskowicz (Kok), 13,407 votes.

2000s

2007
Results of the 2007 parliamentary election held on 18 March 2007:

The following candidates were elected:
Outi Alanko-Kahiluoto (Vihr), 4,622 votes; Paavo Arhinmäki (Vas), 6,859 votes; Sirpa Asko-Seljavaara (Kok), 6,293 votes; Tuija Brax (Vihr), 9,692 votes; Tuula Haatainen (SDP), 6,686 votes; Pekka Haavisto (Vihr), 5,418 votes; Juha Hakola (Kok), 4,258 votes; Eero Heinäluoma (SDP), 10,948 votes; Rakel Hiltunen (SDP), 6,205 votes; Arja Karhuvaara (Kok), 4,069 votes; Mari Kiviniemi (Kesk), 7,385 votes; Päivi Lipponen (SDP), 4,202 votes; Sanna Perkiö (Kok), 5,639 votes; Pertti Salolainen (KoK), 8,621 votes; Sari Sarkomaa (Kok), 9,155 votes; Anni Sinnemäki (Vihr), 7,694 votes; Johanna Sumuvuori (Vihr), 5,173 votes; Astrid Thors (SFP), 5,938 votes; Erkki Tuomioja (SDP), 12,894 votes; Jan Vapaavuori (Kok), 9,091 votes; and Ben Zyskowicz (Kok), 17,607 votes.

2003
Results of the 2003 parliamentary election held on 16 March 2003:

The following candidates were elected:
Sirpa Asko-Seljavaara (Kok), 6,982 votes; Eva Biaudet (SFP), 7,868 votes; Tuija Brax (Vihr), 7,747 votes; Arto Bryggare (SDP), 4,786 votes; Tuula Haatainen (SDP), 9,341 votes; Tony Halme (PS), 16,390 votes; Leena Harkimo (Kok), 6,690 votes; Rakel Hiltunen (SDP), 7,788 votes; Anneli Jäätteenmäki (Kesk), 15,704 votes; Irina Krohn (Vihr), 4,698 votes; Jere Lahti (Kok), 5,257 votes; Paavo Lipponen (SDP), 26,415 votes; Outi Ojala (Vas), 6,658 votes; Pertti Salovaara (Kesk), 1,600 votes; Sari Sarkomaa (Kok), 5,355 votes; Anni Sinnemäki (Vihr), 4,154 votes; Osmo Soininvaara (Vihr), 11,341 votes; Ilkka Taipale (SDP), 4,090 votes; Erkki Tuomioja (SDP), 9,548 votes; Jan Vapaavuori (Kok), 4,657 votes; and Ben Zyskowicz (Kok), 12,780 votes.

1990s

1999
Results of the 1999 parliamentary election held on 21 March 1999:

The following candidates were elected:
Esko Aho (Kesk), 11,869 votes; Pirjo-Riitta Antvuori (Kok), 4,210 votes; Eva Biaudet (SFP), 10,362 votes; Tuija Brax (Vihr), 11,587 votes; Klaus Bremer (SFP), 5,386 votes; Tuula Haatainen (SDP), 5,258 votes; Tarja Halonen (SDP), 15,817 votes; Rakel Hiltunen (SDP), 4,392 votes; Seppo Kanerva (Kok), 4,283 votes; Paula Kokkonen (Kok), 5,102 votes; Irina Krohn (Vihr), 7,616 votes; Paavo Lipponen (SDP), 11,823 votes; Sauli Niinistö (Kok), 30,450 votes; Outi Ojala (Vas), 6,503 votes; Kirsi Piha (Kok), 7,391 votes; Sari Sarkomaa (Kok), 3,151 votes; Anni Sinnemäki (Vihr), 4,781 votes; Osmo Soininvaara (Vihr), 8,122 votes; Erkki Tuomioja (SDP), 7,214 votes; and Ben Zyskowicz (Kok), 13,338 votes.

1995
Results of the 1995 parliamentary election held on 19 March 1995:

The following candidates were elected:
Arja Alho (SDP), 5,733 votes; Eva Biaudet (SFP), 8,094 votes; Tuija Brax (Vihr), 9,091 votes; Klaus Bremer (SFP), 6,395 votes; Arto Bryggare (SDP), 6,196 votes; Tarja Halonen (SDP), 10,333 votes; Paula Kokkonen (Kok), 6,371 votes; Irina Krohn (Vihr), 5,006 votes; Paavo Lipponen (SDP), 13,085 votes; Outi Ojala (Vas), 6,145 votes; Reino Paasilinna (SDP), 9,535 votes; Risto E. J. Penttilä (Nour), 9,322 votes; Kirsi Piha (Kok), 12,532 votes; Anssi Rauramo (Kok), 4,842 votes; Pertti Salolainen (Kok), 16,002 votes; Esko Seppänen (Vas), 11,732 votes; Osmo Soininvaara (Vihr), 5,638 votes; Erkki Tuomioja (SDP), 6,980 votes; and Ben Zyskowicz (Kok), 11,882 votes.

1991
Results of the 1991 parliamentary election held on 17 March 1991:

The following candidates were elected:
Arja Alho (SDP), 8,434 votes; Pirjo-Riitta Antvuori (Kok), 4,788 votes; Eva Biaudet (SFP), 3,440 votes; Jörn Donner (SFP), 13,019 votes; Pekka Haavisto (Vihr), 5,424 votes; Tarja Halonen (SDP), 6,420 votes; Heidi Hautala (Vihr), 13,674 votes; Ulpu Iivari (SDP), 4,726 votes; Ritva Laurila (Kok), 8,793 votes; Paavo Lipponen (SDP), 4,344 votes; Hannele Luukkainen (Vihr), 3,116 votes; Eeva-Liisa Moilanen (SKL), 7,066 votes; Outi Ojala (Vas), 3,093 votes; Anssi Rauramo (Kok), 4,506 votes; Olli Rehn (Kesk), 4,400 votes; Pertti Salolainen (Kok), 18,515 votes; Esko Seppänen (Vas), 9,848 votes; Ilkka Suominen (Kok), 6,460 votes; Erkki Tuomioja (SDP), 9,728 votes; and Ben Zyskowicz (Kok), 9,435 votes.

1980s

1987
Results of the 1987 parliamentary election held on 15 and 16 March 1987:

The following candidates were elected:
Arja Alho (SDP), 8,090 votes; Pirjo-Riitta Antvuori (Kok), 5,825 votes; Ilkka-Christian Björklund (SDP), 2,983 votes; Jörn Donner (SFP), 9,876 votes; Pekka Haavisto (Vihr), 7,891 votes; Tarja Halonen (SDP), 7,446 votes; Seija Karkinen (SDP), 3,584 votes; Ritva Laurila (Kok), 4,880 votes; Ingvar S. Melin (SFP), 7,638 votes; Eeva-Liisa Moilanen (SKL), 7,745 votes; Reino Paasilinna (SDP), 9,650 votes; Anssi Rauramo (Kok), 5,800 votes; Pertti Salolainen (Kok), 18,324 votes; Esko Seppänen (SKDL), 6,340 votes; Eva-Riitta Siitonen (Kok), 13,543 votes; Osmo Soininvaara (Vihr), 3,994 votes; Kalevi Sorsa (SDP), 17,585 votes; Ilkka Suominen (Kok), 10,819 votes; Ole Wasz-Höckert (SFP), 5,907 votes; and Ben Zyskowicz (Kok), 8,899 votes.

1983
Results of the 1983 parliamentary election held on 20 and 21 March 1983:

The following candidates were elected:
Arja Alho (SDP), 7,065 votes; Georg C. Ehrnrooth (POP), 7,115 votes; Reijo Enävaara (SMP), 14,514 votes; Tarja Halonen (SDP), 6,317 votes; Tuure Junnila (Kok), 5,769 votes; Kalevi Kivistö (SKDL), 16,755 votes; Kalle Könkkölä (List C), 2,603 votes; Liisa Kulhia (Kesk-LKP), 4,093 votes; Ritva Laurila (Kok), 5,367 votes; Paavo Lipponen (SDP), 5,421 votes; Reino Paasilinna (SDP), 12,728 votes; Pertti Salolainen (Kok), 20,202 votes; Eva-Riitta Siitonen (Kok), 11,385 votes; Kalevi Sorsa (SDP), 11,338 votes; Ilkka Suominen (Kok), 9,605 votes; Kaarina Suonio (SDP), 13,901 votes; Seppo Toiviainen (SKDL), 5,725 votes; Ole Wasz-Höckert (SFP), 8,013 votes; Jutta Zilliacus (SFP), 9,995 votes; and Ben Zyskowicz (Kok), 5,791 votes.

1970s

1979
Results of the 1979 parliamentary election held on 18 and 19 March 1979:

The following candidates were elected:
Tarja Halonen (SDP), 5,360 votes; Niilo Hämäläinen (SDP), 7,964 votes; Anna-Liisa Hyvönen (SKDL), 9,377 votes; Jaakko Itälä (LKP), 7,230 votes; Sinikka Karhuvaara (Kok), 7,597 votes; Seija Karkinen (SDP), 7,475 votes; Ritva Laurila (Kok), 6,590 votes; Ingvar S. Melin (SFP), 8,007 votes; Eva Pukkio (Kok), 4,513 votes; Aarne Saarinen (SKDL), 9,112 votes; Arvo Salo (SDP), 7,422 votes; Pertti Salolainen (Kok), 26,562 votes; Pentti Sillantaus (Kok), 6,503 votes; Kalevi Sorsa (SDP), 18,336 votes; Asser Stenbäck (SKL), 5,249 votes; Kaarina Suonio (SDP), 12,488 votes; Seppo Toiviainen (SKDL), 8,915 votes; Jalmari Torikka (Kok), 4,072 votes; Jutta Zilliacus (SFP), 7,058 votes; and Ben Zyskowicz (Kok), 7,604 votes.

1975
Results of the 1975 parliamentary election held on 21 and 22 September 1975:

The following candidates were elected:
Ele Alenius (SKDL), 10,825 votes; Pirkko Aro (SDP), 7,221 votes; Georg C. Ehrnrooth (SPK), 13,175 votes; Ralf Friberg (SDP), 4,152 votes; Kristian Gestrin (SFP), 9,405 votes; Harri Holkeri (Kok), 17,640 votes; Anna-Liisa Hyvönen (SKDL), 11,897 votes; Sinikka Karhuvaara (Kok), 8,251 votes; Seija Karkinen (SDP), 9,422 votes; Olavi Majlander (SKL), 7,747 votes; Ingvar S. Melin (SFP), 7,662 votes; Kullervo Rainio (Kok), 11,461 votes; Aarne Saarinen (SKDL), 9,764 votes; Pertti Salolainen (Kok), 17,977 votes; Kalevi Sorsa (SDP), 21,948 votes; Kaarina Suonio (SDP), 10,149 votes; Pekka Tarjanne (LKP), 6,705 votes; Mirjam Tuominen (SKDL), 12,589 votes; Erkki Tuomioja (SDP), 8,573 votes; Osmo Antero Wiio (LKP), 3,846 votes; and Jutta Zilliacus (SFP), 7,719 votes.

1972
Results of the 1972 parliamentary election held on 2 and 3 January 1972:

The following candidates were elected:
Ele Alenius (SKDL), 8,377 votes; Pirkko Aro (LKP), 7,221 votes; Georg C. Ehrnrooth (SFP), 10,998 votes; Ralf Friberg (SDP), 6,262 votes; Kristian Gestrin (SFP), 10,304 votes; Harri Holkeri (Kok), 12,117 votes; Anna-Liisa Hyvönen (SKDL), 8,079 votes; Raimo Ilaskivi (Kok), 23,565 votes; Sinikka Karhuvaara (Kok), 5,038 votes; Seija Karkinen (SDP), 5,780 votes; Salme Katajavuori (KoK), 3,500 votes; Tellervo Koivisto (SDP), 15,479 votes; Tyyne Paasivuori (SDP), 4,686 votes; Kullervo Rainio (Kok), 5,395 votes; Aarne Saarinen (SKDL), 8,777 votes; Pertti Salolainen (Kok), 12,402 votes; Kalevi Sorsa (SDP), 22,360 votes; Ilkka Taipale (SDP), 4,581 votes; Pekka Tarjanne (LKP), 5,502 votes; Mirjam Tuominen (SKDL), 7,925 votes; Erkki Tuomioja (SDP), 9,715 votes; and Pekka Vennamo (SMP), 7,894 votes.

1970
Results of the 1970 parliamentary election held on 15 and 16 March 1970:

The following candidates were elected:
Ele Alenius (SKDL), 5,999 votes; Pirkko Aro (LKP), 10,061 votes; Georg C. Ehrnrooth (SFP), 13,715 votes; Ralf Friberg (SDP), 6,068 votes; Kristian Gestrin (SFP), 8,823 votes; Erkki Hara (Kok), 3,474 votes; Harri Holkeri (Kok), 12,524 votes; Raimo Ilaskivi (Kok), 20,855 votes; Sinikka Karhuvaara (Kok), 3,750 votes; Seija Karkinen (SDP), 9,013 votes; Salme Katajavuori (KoK), 3,451 votes; Hertta Kuusinen (SKDL), 4,719 votes; Mikko Laaksonen (SDP), 4,194 votes; Ingvar S. Melin (SFP), 6,841 votes; Tyyne Paasivuori (SDP), 7,791 votes; Terho Pursiainen (SKDL), 6,128 votes; Pertti Salolainen (Kok), 19,641 votes; Kalevi Sorsa (SDP), 27,312 votes; Pekka Tarjanne (LKP), 7,787 votes; Niilo Tarvajärvi (Kok), 2,676 votes; Mirjam Tuominen (SKDL), 5,509 votes; and Erkki Tuomioja (SDP), 9,100 votes.

1960s

1966
Results of the 1966 parliamentary election held on 20 and 21 March 1966:

The following candidates were elected:
Ele Alenius (SKDL), 4,922 votes; Jouni Apajalahti (Kok), 4,242 votes; Pirkko Aro (LKP), 5,841 votes; Margit Borg-Sundman (Kok), 5,728 votes; Pauli Burman (SDP), 6,765 votes; Georg C. Ehrnrooth (SFP), 15,316 votes; Kristian Gestrin (SFP), 7,252 votes; Erkki Hara (Kok), 4,476 votes; Raimo Ilaskivi (Kok), 16,817 votes; Hertta Kuusinen (SKDL), 11,155 votes; Mikko Laaksonen (SDP), 5,130 votes; Olavi Laine (SKDL), 3,570 votes; Tyyne Leivo-Larsson (TPSL), 4,568 votes; Väinö Leskinen (SDP), 7,164 votes; Ingvar S. Melin (SFP), 4,941 votes; Tyyne Paasivuori (SDP), 12,754 votes; E. J. Paavola (LKP), 8,146 votes; Kaarlo Pitsinki (SDP), 16,703 votes; L. A. Puntila (SDP), 7,325 votes; Aarne Saarinen (SKDL), 6,948 votes; and Arvo Salo (SDP), 5,100 votes.

1962
Results of the 1962 parliamentary election held on 4 and 5 February 1962:

The following candidates were elected:
Margit Borg-Sundman (Kok), 5,593 votes; Georg C. Ehrnrooth (SFP), 12,525 votes; Karl-August Fagerholm (SDP), 10,524 votes; Kristian Gestrin (SFP), 5,031 votes; Erkki Hara (Kok), 8,407 votes; Armi Hosia (SK), 5,419 votes; Raimo Ilaskivi (Kok), 9,469 votes; Esa Kaitila (SK), 14,163 votes; Kalevi Kilpi (SKDL), 5,446 votes; Hertta Kuusinen (SKDL), 16,000 votes; Väinö Leskinen (SDP), 5,799 votes; Leo Mattila (SK), 3,384 votes; Tyyne Paasivuori (SDP), 8,836 votes; E. J. Paavola (VL), 5,080 votes; Ville Pessi (SKDL), 2,941 votes; Kaarlo Pitsinki (SDP), 9,206 votes; Aarne Saarinen (SKDL), 3,905 votes; Martta Salmela-Järvinen (TPSL), 5,853 votes; Jussi Saukkonen (Kok), 8,003 votes; and J. O. Söderhjelm (SFP), 5,035 votes.

1950s

1958
Results of the 1958 parliamentary election held on 6 and 7 July 1958:

The following candidates were elected:
Margit Borg-Sundman (Kok), 4,312 votes; Georg C. Ehrnrooth (SFP), 9,415 votes; Yrjö Enne (SKDL), 7,841 votes; Karl-August Fagerholm (SDP), 5,530 votes; Erkki Hara (Kok), 4,364 votes; Armi Hosia (SK), 3,103 votes; Aune Innala (Kok), 5,729 votes; Esa Kaitila (SK), 7,810 votes; Hertta Kuusinen (SKDL), 12,176 votes; Lempi Lehto (SDP), 3,896 votes; Erkki Leikola (Kok), 6,368 votes; Väinö Leskinen (SDP), 6,527 votes; Valdemar Liljeström (SDO), 2,054 votes; Nils Meinander (SFP), 4,854 votes; John Österholm (SFP), 6,139 votes; Ville Pessi (SKDL), 2,279 votes; Jussi Saukkonen (Kok), 4,380 votes; Väinö Tanner (SDP), 11,585 votes; and Tyyne Tuominen (SKDL), 2,356 votes.

1954
Results of the 1954 parliamentary election held on 7 and 8 March 1954:

The following candidates were elected:
Yrjö Enne (SKDL); Karl-August Fagerholm (SDP); Armi Hosia (SK); Aune Innala (Kok); Esa Kaitila (SK); Yrjö Kilpeläinen (SDP); Sylvi-Kyllikki Kilpi (SKDL); Lempi Lehto (SDP); Erkki Leikola (Kok); Tyyne Leivo-Larsson (SDP); Väinö Leskinen (SDP); Leo Mattila (SK); Nils Meinander (SFP); Unto Miettinen (SKDL); Arne Öhman (SFP); John Österholm (SFP); Tyyne Paasivuori (SDP); Ville Pessi (SKDL); and Arvo Salminen (Kok).

References

1954 establishments in Finland
Constituencies established in 1954
parliamentary electoral district
Parliament of Finland electoral districts